Oued Fodda District is a district of Chlef Province, Algeria.

Communes 
The district is further divided into 3 communes:

 Oued Fodda 41 710
 Beni Rached 23 449
 Ouled Abbes 8 578

References

Districts of Chlef Province